Villamanrique is a municipality in Ciudad Real, Castile-La Mancha, Spain. It has a population of 1,559.

Municipalities in the Province of Ciudad Real